The 2011 KNSB Dutch Single Distance Championships were held at the Thialf ice stadium in Heerenveen from 5 November until 7 November 2010. Although the tournament was held in 2010 it was the 2011 edition as it is part of the 2010/2011 speed skating season.

Schedule

Medalists

Men 

Source: SchaatsStatistieken.nl

Women 

Source: SchaatsStatistieken.nl

References

External links
 KNSB
 Official Website

Dutch Single Distance Championships
Single Distance Championships
2011 Single Distance
KNSB Dutch Single Distance Championships, 2011